Mary Elizabeth Roché (January 9, 1918 – February 16, 1999) was an American blues singer. Though she had a sporadic career, she became best known for her version of "Take the "A" Train" with its composer Duke Ellington, and, according to AllMusic, "was famous for her strong, dramatic way of putting across blues material".

Biography
Roché was born in Wilmington, Delaware, as Mary Elizabeth Roach, and was raised by her grandparents in Atlantic City, New Jersey.  She won a talent contest at the Apollo Theater after settling in New York City in 1939, and then sang with the Savoy Sultans in 1941. The band broke up shortly after she joined it, but she did make her first recording with this group. The following year, she joined the Duke Ellington Orchestra in succession to Ivie Anderson Making an appearance in the film Reveille with Beverly (1944), it also featured Frank Sinatra and Count Basie. She performed a vocal version of "Take the A Train" in the film, but the AFM recording ban meant that she could not make a recording of it at the time. She also sang in Ellington's performance of his "Black, Brown and Beige" suite at Carnegie Hall, but again no recordings were made at the time, and by the time Ellington was able to record it in 1944, Roché had left the band.

She also sang with Lester Young and Hot Lips Page, and in the 1940s performed at Minton's Playhouse with bebop musicians including Thelonious Monk and Kenny Clarke.  She joined the Earl Hines band in 1944, and recorded with him, before leaving the music business for a few years. In 1951, she rejoined Ellington, and the following year finally recorded an extended version of "Take the A Train" on the LP Ellington Uptown. She left Ellington again in 1954. Settling in San Diego, California, and worked occasionally in clubs and with Charles Brown and Clark Terry. In the mid-1950s, she was part of the cast recording of The Complete Porgy and Bess. She recorded three albums as leader, Take the A Train for Bethlehem) in 1956, and for Prestige Records in 1960 Singin and Swingin and Lightly and Politely the following year, but was unwilling to maintain a full-time career in music.

Roché died in Pleasantville, New Jersey in February 1999, aged 81.

Discography
Take the "A" Train (Bethlehem, 1956)
Singin' & Swingin' (Prestige, 1960)
Lightly and Politely (Prestige, 1961)

References

External links
Betty Roché page in Fuller Up, The Dead Musicians Directory
Betty Roché: 1920-1999
 New York Times obituary

1918 births
1999 deaths
American blues singers
American women jazz singers
Duke Ellington Orchestra members
Prestige Records artists
American jazz singers
Musicians from Wilmington, Delaware
20th-century American singers
20th-century American women singers